Panna Kaiser (born 25 May 1950) is a Bangladesh Awami League politician and a former member of Jatiya Sangsad selected for the women's reserved seats during 1996–2001. She was awarded 2021 Bangla Academy Literary Award in the research on liberation war category.

Early life and career
Kaiser completed her master's in Bengali literature from the University of Dhaka in 1969. In 1996, she was selected as one of the 30 reserved seats for women to serve as a member of parliament. She has been contributing in a child organization named Khelaghar. She is engaged in various social activities,  cultural event and writeup.

Personal life
Kaiser married Shahidullah Kaiser, a writer and a journalist on 17 February 1969. He was abducted from his home on 14 December 1971 by the paramilitary Al-Badr and was not seen again since then. She has a daughter, Shomi Kaiser, an actress and a son Amitav Kaiser.

Awards 

 Bangla Academy Literary Award (2021)

References

Living people
1950 births
People from Comilla District
University of Dhaka alumni
Awami League politicians
7th Jatiya Sangsad members
Women members of the Jatiya Sangsad
20th-century Bangladeshi women politicians
Recipients of Bangla Academy Award